The 1985 Seattle Seahawks season was the team's tenth season with the National Football League (NFL). The team finished with an 8-8 record and a 3rd place finish in the AFC West and missed the playoffs.

Offseason

Draft

Undrafted free agents

Personnel

Staff

Final roster

     Starters in bold.
 (*) Denotes players that were selected for the 1986 Pro Bowl.

Schedule

Preseason

Source: Seahawks Media Guides

Regular season
Divisional matchups have the AFC West playing the NFC West.

Bold indicates division opponents.
Source: 1985 NFL season results

Standings

Game Summaries

Preseason

Week P1: at Indianapolis Colts

Week P2: vs. Detroit Lions

Week P3: at Minnesota Vikings

Week P4: vs. San Francisco 49ers

Regular season

Week 1: at Cincinnati Bengals

Week 2: at San Diego Chargers

Week 3: vs. Los Angeles Rams

Week 4: at Kansas City Chiefs

Week 5: vs. San Diego Chargers

Week 6: vs. Atlanta Falcons

Week 7: at Denver Broncos

Week 8 at Jets

Week 9: vs. Los Angeles Raiders

Week 10: at New Orleans Saints

Week 11: vs. New England Patriots

Week 12: at San Francisco 49ers

Week 13: vs. Kansas City Chiefs

Week 14: vs. Cleveland Browns

Week 15: at Los Angeles Raiders

Week 16: vs. Denver Broncos

References

External links
 Seahawks draft history at NFL.com
 1985 NFL season results at NFL.com

Seattle
Seattle Seahawks seasons